Krzysztof Brzozowski (born 15 July 1993) is a Polish shot putter.

He won a gold medal at the inaugural 2010 Summer Youth Olympics, with a then-World Youth Best of 23.23 m.

Competition record

References

External links

 

1993 births
Living people
Polish male shot putters
Sportspeople from Katowice
Athletes (track and field) at the 2010 Summer Youth Olympics
Youth Olympic gold medalists for Poland
Youth Olympic gold medalists in athletics (track and field)